WZUP (104.7 FM) is a radio station broadcasting a Regional Mexican format. Licensed to La Grange, North Carolina, United States, it serves the Greenville-New Bern-Morehead City area. The station is currently owned by Conner Media.

History
WZUP went on the air in 1993 as WBSY 104.7 FM, licensed to Rose Hill, North Carolina. WBSY was a simulcast of WEGG, and branded as The Wonderful Egg with a format consisting of Country music and Southern Gospel music. Thru The Bible Radio with Dr. J. Vernon McGee was part of the programming. Many local churches aired their ministries on the station as well. The station carried programming from ABC News, The North Carolina News Network, and Southern Farm Network. James Kenan High School football and Wake Forest sports were part of the programming as well.

In 1995, Jeff Barnes Wilson died, and Duplin County Broadcasters sold WBSY and sister station WEGG to Conner Media Corporation on June 7, 1996. The station, shortly afterward, became Country Bear 104.7 & 710. The full-time country format proved to be unsuccessful, and the format was changed to full-time traditional black gospel.

In 1999, WBSY broke away from the simulcast, and became a part of the Go Mix! Network.

In 2003, the call letters were changed to WZUP, the station was relocated to a tower in Kinston, North Carolina, and a new Regional Mexican format was launched.

External links
 

ZUP